Canariphantes is a genus of  dwarf spiders that was first described by J. Wunderlich in 1992. It might be a junior synonym of Lepthyphantes.

Species
 it contains thirteen species and one subspecies:
Canariphantes acoreensis (Wunderlich, 1992) – Azores
Canariphantes alpicola Wunderlich, 1992 (type) – Canary Is.
Canariphantes atlassahariensis (Bosmans, 1991) – Algeria
Canariphantes barrientosi Bosmans, 2019 – Spain (Balearic Is.)
Canariphantes epigynatus Tanasevitch, 2013 – Israel
Canariphantes junipericola Crespo & Bosmans, 2014 – Azores
Canariphantes naili (Bosmans & Bouragba, 1992) – Algeria
Canariphantes nanus (Kulczyński, 1898) – Central to eastern Europe, Israel
Canariphantes palmaensis Wunderlich, 2011 – Canary Is.
Canariphantes relictus Crespo & Bosmans, 2014 – Azores
Canariphantes ritae (Bosmans, 1985) – Spain, Morocco, Algeria, Tunisia
Canariphantes tenerrimus (Simon, 1929) – Portugal, Spain, France, Greece, Algeria, Morocco
Canariphantes zonatus (Simon, 1884) – Portugal, France, Sardinia, Algeria, Morocco, Tunisia
Canariphantes z. lucifugus (Simon, 1929) – France

See also
 List of Linyphiidae species

References

Araneomorphae genera
Linyphiidae
Spiders of Africa
Spiders of Asia